Oleksander "Alex" Semenets (March 10, 1990 – late August 2020) was a Canadian professional soccer player who played as a midfielder.

Early life
Semenets moved from his native Ukraine to Canada in 1998, settling in Mississauga, Ontario. He attended Iona Catholic High School and played club soccer for the Oakville Blue Stars before joining the Vancouver Whitecaps residency program in 2007.

Club career
Semenets played with the Vancouver Whitecaps Residency squad in the USL Premier Development League season in 2008 and 2009, helping his team to the PDL playoffs in his debut season, before being called up to the senior Vancouver Whitecaps side following the conclusion of the 2009 PDL season. He made his first-team debut on July 25, 2010, in a match against the NSC Minnesota Stars, coming on as a substitute in the 80th minute.

On March 5, 2011 Semenets signed with FC Edmonton, an expansion club in the second division North American Soccer League. The club re-signed Semenets for the 2012 season on October 12, 2011.

In 2014 he briefly appeared for Cape Breton University.

International career
Semenets received his first national team call-up for the Canadian under-17 team in April 2006 for the Ballymena U-16 Tournament. He subsequently played for Canada at the 2007 CONCACAF U17 Tournament in Jamaica, making three appearances.

In September 2009, Semenets was named to the Canadian under-20 team for the 2009 Jeux de la Francophonie in Lebanon. In the first match of the tournament against Rwanda, Semenets came off the bench to score two goals in a 3–2 loss. In the second and final group stage match against Cameroon, he received his first start and scored the second goal in a 2–0 win which enabled Canada to advance from the group stage on goal difference.

Semenets started in the semi-final against Congo Republic and after the match went to penalties after finishing 2–2, Semenets scored Canada's lone penalty as they lost the shootout 2–1. He also appeared off the bench in the consolation match against Morocco, a 3–1 loss.

Death
On September 4, 2020, Vancouver Whitecaps released a statement announcing Semenets' passing the previous week, accompanied by statements from former teammates and coaches, including Philippe Davies, Gagan Dosanjh, Randy Edwini-Bonsu, Ethan Gage, Navid Mashinchi, Kyle Porter, Antonio Rago, Adam Straith, Russell Teibert, Simon Thomas and Bob Lenarduzzi. His place and cause of death were not disclosed.

References

External links

 
 
 
 

1990 births
2020 deaths
Association football forwards
Canadian soccer players
Ukrainian footballers
Footballers from Kyiv
Soccer players from Mississauga
Ukrainian emigrants to Canada
Naturalized citizens of Canada
Vancouver Whitecaps Residency players
Vancouver Whitecaps (1986–2010) players
FC Edmonton players
Toronto Lynx players
USL League Two players
USSF Division 2 Professional League players
North American Soccer League players
Canada men's youth international soccer players